The 2013 VTR Open was a tennis tournament played on clay courts. It was the 20th edition of the VTR Open, and part of the ATP World Tour 250 series of the 2013 ATP World Tour. It took place in Viña del Mar, Chile from February 2 through February 10, 2013. This tournament was notably the first one in which Rafael Nadal competed since his defeat at the 2012 Wimbledon Championships.

Singles main draw entrants

Seeds 

 Rankings are as of January 28, 2013.

Other entrants 
The following players received wildcards into the singles main draw:
  Christian Garín
  Nicolás Massú 
  Rafael Nadal

The following players received entry from the qualifying draw:
  Federico Delbonis
  Dušan Lajović
  Gianluca Naso 
  Diego Schwartzman

Withdrawals
Before the tournament
  Igor Andreev
During the tournament
  Guillaume Rufin (abdominal strain)

Doubles main draw entrants

Seeds 

 Rankings are as of January 28, 2013.

Other entrants 
The following pairs received wildcards into the doubles main draw:
  Christian Garín /  Nicolas Jarry
  Gonzalo Lama /  Nicolás Massú

Finals

Singles 

  Horacio Zeballos defeated  Rafael Nadal, 6–7(2–7), 7–6(8–6), 6–4
 It was Zeballos's 1st title of his career.

Doubles 

 Paolo Lorenzi /  Potito Starace defeated  Juan Mónaco /  Rafael Nadal, 6–2, 6–4

References

External links 
 

VTR Open
Chile Open (tennis)
VTR Open